Namaka may refer to

 Nāmaka, Hawaiian mythological sea goddess
 Namaka (moon), inner moon of the dwarf planet Haumea
 Namaka, Alberta, hamlet in southern Alberta, Canada
 Namaka, Fiji, a place in Fiji next to Nadi, home of Pacific Island Air